Ad-e Qomeys (also known as ‘Add-e Ghomays, ‘Add-e Ghomey, ‘Add-e Ghomeyes, ‘Ad-e Khomeys, ‘Edd Khomeyes, and ‘Edd Qomeyes) is a village in Abdoliyeh-ye Gharbi Rural District, in the Central District of Ramshir County, Khuzestan Province, Iran. At the 2006 census, its population was 56 in 12 families.

References 

Populated places in Ramshir County